The 2022–23 season is the 99th season in the existence of AEK Athens F.C. and the 62nd competitive season and eighth consecutive in the top flight of Greek football. They are competing in the Super League and the Greek Cup. The season covers the period from 1 July 2022 to 30 June 2023.

Players

Squad information

NOTE: The players are the ones that have been announced by the AEK Athens' press release. No edits should be made unless a player's arrival or exit is announced. Updated 12 March 2023, 21:00 UTC+2.

Transfers

In

Summer

Winter

Out

Summer

Winter

Loan in

Summer

Loan out

Summer

Notes

 a.  Saint-Étienne keeps the 30% of the player's rights.

 b.  Hoffenheim keeps 30% of the player's rights.

 c.  His loan was terminated in order for him to be transferred on a permanent deal.

 d.  AEK keeps the 50% of the player's rights.

 e.  AEK keeps the 40% of the player's rights.

Renewals

Overall transfer activity

Expenditure
Summer:  €5,800,000

Winter:  €0

Total:  €5,800,000

Income
Summer:  €3,200,000

Winter:  €0

Total:  €3,200,000

Net Totals
Summer:  €2,600,000

Winter:  €0

Total:  €2,600,000

Pre-season and friendlies

Super League Greece

Regular season

League table

Results by Matchday

Fixtures

Play-off round

Table

Results by Matchday

Fixtures

Greek Cup

AEK entered the Greek Cup at the Fifth Round.

Matches

Round of 16

Quarter-finals

Semi-finals

Statistics

Squad statistics

! colspan="11" style="background:#FFDE00; text-align:center" | Goalkeepers
|-

! colspan="11" style="background:#FFDE00; color:black; text-align:center;"| Defenders
|-

! colspan="11" style="background:#FFDE00; color:black; text-align:center;"| Midfielders
|-

! colspan="11" style="background:#FFDE00; color:black; text-align:center;"| Forwards
|-

! colspan="11" style="background:#FFDE00; color:black; text-align:center;"| Left during Summer Transfer Window
|-

! colspan="11" style="background:#FFDE00; color:black; text-align:center;"| Left during Summer Winter Window
|-

! colspan="11" style="background:#FFDE00; color:black; text-align:center;"| From AEK Athens B
|-

|}

Disciplinary record

|-
! colspan="17" style="background:#FFDE00; text-align:center" | Goalkeepers

|-
! colspan="17" style="background:#FFDE00; color:black; text-align:center;"| Defenders

|-
! colspan="17" style="background:#FFDE00; color:black; text-align:center;"| Midfielders

|-
! colspan="17" style="background:#FFDE00; color:black; text-align:center;"| Forwards

|-
! colspan="17" style="background:#FFDE00; color:black; text-align:center;"| Left during Summer Transfer Window

|-
! colspan="17" style="background:#FFDE00; color:black; text-align:center;"| Left during Winter Transfer Window

|-
! colspan="17" style="background:#FFDE00; color:black; text-align:center;"| From AEK Athens B

|}

References

External links
AEK Athens F.C. Official Website

AEK Athens F.C. seasons
AEK Athens